Timuay Imbing (sometimes referred to as "Timuay Beng Imbing" or "Timuay Labi Beng Imbing"; with the personal name sometimes spelled Mbeng) was the Timuay or ancestral leader of the Subanen people the Zamboanga peninsula in the Philippines during the American colonial Period.  One of the most prominent Thimuay in Philippine history, he is perhaps best known for his role in introducing Evangelical Protestantism, through the Christian and Missionary Alliance Churches of the Philippines, to the Subanon people, and for establishing the settlement which would become the present-day municipality of Lapuyan, Zamboanga del Sur.

Thimuay Imbing was the ancestor of the royal Imbing clan of Lapuyan, among whom several individuals have retained the title of "Timuay." Thimuay Imbing is sometimes called "Timuay Labi" or "Highest Timuay" in deference to his achievements as leader of the Lapuyan Subanen.

See also
Timuay
Lapuyan, Zamboanga del Sur
Subanen people
Paramount rulers in early Philippine history - for an explanation of the rank "Thimuan Labi"

References 

People from Zamboanga del Sur
Subanon people